Ciğatay (also, Cığatay, Cıqatay, Dzhigata, and Dzhigatay) is a village and municipality in the Khachmaz Rayon of Azerbaijan.  It has a population of 656.

References 

Populated places in Khachmaz District